Twoloud, formerly stylized as twoloud, now stylized as TWOLOUD, is the name of a German DJ musical project consisting of members Manuel Reuter (also known as Manian), Alexander Thomas (Alex Castle) along with Dennis Nicholls (aka D-Style). The project was founded in 2013 and are active mainly in the genres of progressive house and big room house. Although the project's anonymity has been revealed in mid-2014, the musicians were asking to be judged only by their music, not faces.

The style of TWOLOUD is unique, with the lead sound of the song "Greatest DJ", for example, being strongly linked to that of duo Showtek. Similar comparisons were given to the songs "Drop It Like This", which contains influences by Tujamo, and "I'm Alive" resembling the sound of Canadian duo DVBBS.

For a long time, the members of TWOLOUD remained anonymous. In their live performances they appeared in ninja costumes and on their album covers they had never been seen. For a long time TWOLOUD was suspected to be a joint project of the Dutch DJs Hardwell and Tiësto. Their anonymity was an advantage to lesser-known artists, who would often announce that they were TWOLOUD. However, in mid-2014, it was announced that TWOLOUD was a project of the two German DJs Manian and D-Style. This was due to pictures the duo was on and the fact that they were credited on their songs.

Personnel
Current members
Manian (Manuel Reuter) - DJ, producer
Alex Castle (Alexander Thomas) - songwriter, producer
D-Style (Dennis Nicholls) - DJ, producer

Singles
2013:
twoloud - Big Bang
twoloud - Traffic (Tiësto Edit)

2014:
twoloud - Track One [Free Download]
twoloud vs. Julian Jordan - Rockin
TST & twoloud - Drop It Like This
twoloud vs Danny Avila - Rock the Place
twoloud - Greatest DJ
twoloud - I'm Alive
twoloud - Twisted
twoloud - Track Two [Free Download]
twoloud - Track Three [Free Download]
twoloud featuring Christian Burns - We Are the Ones
Deniz Koyu vs twoloud - Goin Down
twoloud featuring Will Brennan - Get Down

2015:
twoloud - The Biz
twoloud - Outside World
Sonic One vs twoloud - The Drums
twoloud - Right Now
twoloud & Kaaze - Color Pop
twoloud - Move (Showtek Edit)
twoloud - Higher Off the Ground
twoloud vs Mojjjo and Mind'CD - Objectif
twoloud & Qulinez - Perfection
twoloud & Bounce Inc. - Hope
twoloud & Kaaze - Maji
twoloud & Konih - One More

2016:
twoloud & Cranksters - Work It
TWOLOUD - Affected
TWOLOUD - Boston
TWOLOUD & FRDY - Fix Me (Official PAROOKAVILLE Anthem 2016)
Laidback Luke & TWOLOUD - Fcukin Beats
TWOLOUD - My Remedy (Official Untold Festival Anthem)
TWOLOUD & Bounce Inc - Ain't Talkin' Bout Love 
TWOLOUD & Konih - Gimme Some More
MORTEN & TWOLOUD - Certified

2017:
TWOLOUD & MureKian - Free
TWOLOUD x DJ KUBA & NEITAN - Mirror On The Wall
TWOLOUD & Bounce Inc. vs. Daav One - Bonkers
TWOLOUD & Mairee - What You Got
TWOLOUD - Flipflops

2018:
Twoloud & Kyanu - Six Beats
Twoloud - All About That Bass
Twoloud & Haechi - Give Up
Twoloud - Discofans
Twoloud & Stupid Goldfish - Elepfunk

2019:
Twoloud & Nuki - Double Double
Twoloud, Lo'did and Jenil - Bad Boy Flow
Twoloud & JustLuke - Be The One
Twoloud - Keep It Warm

2020
Twoloud - Bust It
Twoloud - Sweaty Hands

Remixes
2013:
 Binary Finary - 1998
 Plastik Funk - Let Me See Ya
 Galantis - You (with Tiësto)
 Afrojack featuring Spree Wilson - The Spark (with Tiësto)
 Linkin Park x Steve Aoki - A Light That Never Comes

2014:
 Hardwell featuring Matthew Koma - Dare You (with Tiësto)
 Showtek - We Like to Party
 Tiësto - Red Lights
 The Chainsmokers featuring sirenXX - Kanye (with Steve Aoki)
 Nervo & Ivan Gough featuring Beverley Knight - Not Taking This No More
 David Guetta & Showtek featuring Vassy - Bad
 Calvin Harris - Summer
 Afrojack - Ten Feet Tall
 Rank 1 - Airwave
 Tiësto & Hardwell - Zero 76
 Seven Lions featuring Ellie Goulding - Don't Leave (with Tiësto)

2015:
 Dirty Rush & Gregor Es - Pressure (twoloud Edit)
 Lars Pager & Derek Hake - Onyx (twoloud Edit)
 Dotan - Home (with Tiësto)
 Fragma - Toca Me
 Hotlife and Tomo Hirata featuring Johnny Rose - One Last Time (Sofia to Tokyo Edit)
 Zedd featuring Jon Bellion - Beautiful Now
 Cosmo & Skoro - Bingo (twoloud Edit)
 Showtek featuring Vassy - Satisfied
2016:
 DJ Kuba and Neitan - ROCK! (twoloud Edit)
 Sonic One - Punk! (twoloud Edit)
 Denine - Keep on Lovin
 Tim3bomb - Get Money
 Niels Van Gogh - Dope
 Sonic One - We Rock This Club (TWOLOUD Edit)
 Jean Beatz and Jegers - Front2Back (TWOLOUD Edit)
2017:
 Green Ketchup - Bubble
 Laidback Luke x Konih - Like This

References

External links
Official website

German DJs
German record producers
Musical groups established in 2013
German electronic musicians
Electronic dance music DJs
2013 establishments in Germany